Andrew Agnew may refer to:
Sir Andrew Agnew, 2nd Baronet (died 1671)
Sir Andrew Agnew, 3rd Baronet (died 1702), Scottish MP for Wigtownshire 1685, 1689–1702
Sir Andrew Agnew, 5th Baronet (1687–1771), British lieutenant-general
Sir Andrew Agnew, 7th Baronet (1793–1849), British MP for Wigtownshire 1830–1837
Sir Andrew Agnew, 8th Baronet (1818–1892), 7th Baronet's son and 9th Baronet's father, British MP for Wigtownshire 1856–1868
Sir Andrew Agnew, 9th Baronet (1850–1928), 8th Baronet's son, British MP for Edinburgh South
Andrew Agnew (actor) (born 1976), Scottish actor